The  is an automobile nameplate used by the Japanese automobile manufacturer Daihatsu since 1974 for three different off-road oriented vehicles:

 Daihatsu Taft (F10), a mini off-road vehicle built from 1974 to 1984
 Daihatsu Taft (F70), a rebadged Rugger sold in Indonesia from 1984 to 2007
 Daihatsu Taft (LA900), a crossover-styled kei car built since 2020

Taft
Cars introduced in 1974